Power Drive Rally is a racing video game developed by Rage Software and published by Time Warner Interactive for the Atari Jaguar in North America and Europe in 1995. It was also published in Japan by Messe Sansao on the same year. It is the sequel to Power Drive, which was released earlier in 1994 on multiple platforms.

Themed around rallying, the players race in multiple types of events on various regions and countries around the world and earning money by choosing either of the six officially licensed cars from vehicle manufacturers such as Fiat, BMC, Vauxhall, Renault, Ford and Toyota. Although the game inherits most of its game design and mechanics from the original Power Drive, all of the tracks and many of its featured vehicles are new in the sequel.

Power Drive Rally received mixed reviews when it was released with critics praising the graphics, controls, difficulty and gameplay, while also being criticized for the music and slow pacing by some critics, sound effects and for being too similar to its 16-bit original entry but regardless, it was named "Best Jaguar Game of the Year" by VideoGames and it was referred by multiple publications such as GameFan and Ultimate Future Games as one of the best games for the system. Retrospective reviews have been more positive.

Gameplay 

Power Drive Rally is a top-down rally racing game where players observe from above and races across various parts of the world by participating in several events. There are a total of 34 stages to race along, each having their own weather conditions that changes how the car is controlled through the track and two modes of play. Progress is manually saved after completing each race in either of the three slots available via the cartridge's EEPROM and they are allowed to resume their last race saved at the main menu by pressing C on the controller. The internal memory in the game cartridge also saves high-scores and other settings made by the player.

In the single-player mode, players have to compete in a racing season across multiple regions and countries around the world such as England, Finland, Italy, Arizona, France, Sweden, Kenya and Corsica by facing three types of events at the beginning such as special stage, rally cross and skill test in order qualify for the next race and earn funds to keep competing. Special stage events pits the player racing against time while facing multiple obstacles, each one consisting of three-laps, while rally cross events are races against a CPU-controlled opponent and they also consists of three-laps as well. Skill test involves the player testing their driving abilities to start and stop, backing up and other skills in specially designed courses with obstacles against time, which can be penalized if any traffic cone is dropped. Endurance, a fourth type of event is introduced later in the game and involves the player in five-lap races before the time runs out. Failing to qualify for the next race results in the player paying a re-entry fee to try again and the game is over once they run out of money. In some tracks, there are items available to pick-up such as money, stopwatches that freezes time for five seconds and nitrous that gives the player a boost in speed. On night tracks, players have to turn their headlights by pressing 2 on the controller's keypad. Returning from Power Drive is the damage system, where if any component of the car takes too much damage will lead a change in the vehicle's in-game behavior, increasing the difficulty to race on the track and after finishing the race, players can choose or not to repair a specific part of their vehicle. There is also a practice mode where players can test their driving skills on any of the four selectable tracks, each with their own pre-set obstacles and a multiplayer mode where two players race in a head-to-head match on any of the single-player tracks but items are not available.

Development and release 

Power Drive Rally was first showcased to the public in an early playable state at SCES '94 under the name Rage Rally. In a 1995 preview article by Computer and Video Games magazine, it was revealed that Power Drive Rally was in development since February 1994 and at the same time as with Power Drive for both the Super NES and Mega Drive. It was later showcased in a near-finished state during WCES '95 and Spring ECTS '95. French magazine Consoles + reported that the game would support two-player simultaneous multiplayer via the JagLink peripheral, but it is unknown if the final release still features support for the accessory. It made its last trade show appearance at E3 1995. It is also the only game in the Jaguar's library that features an alternative packaging design for other regions.

In an interview with Philip Nixon, sole designer and artist of Power Drive Rally, he and the game's programmer Peter Johnson contacted the Liverpool offices of Rage Software and were offered to convert the SNES version of Power Drive to the Jaguar. Philip was responsible for all the art and tracks in the game, while he reused and upgraded the original art files, in addition to the increased resolution to scale down the sprites for improved gameplay view. While in a March 1995 interview with online magazine Atari Explorer Online, Peter stated that all of the game's programming relies upon the system's Blitter processor and that it runs at 50 frames per second, in addition of having a lesser number of tracks compared to the original game, among other features. It was created by a small team of four people in total.

Reception

Pre-release 
When previewed in their March 1995 issue, Dave Halverson of GameFan remarked that the game needed fixes in the controls and voice samples but gave positive remarks to the graphics and attention to detail, stating that "This is gonna' be a good one!".

Post-release 

Next Generation reviewed the Jaguar version of the game, and stated that "if you're feeling nostalgic for the good old-fashioned overhead racer, this is a good one to check out."

References

External links 
 Power Drive Rally at AtariAge
 Power Drive Rally at GameFAQs
 Power Drive Rally at MobyGames

1995 video games
Atari Jaguar games
Atari Jaguar-only games
Multiplayer and single-player video games
Racing video games
Rage Games games
Time Warner Interactive games
Top-down racing video games
Video games developed in the United Kingdom
Video game sequels
Video games set in Arizona
Video games set in Corsica
Video games set in England
Video games set in Finland
Video games set in France
Video games set in Italy
Video games set in Kenya
Video games set in Sweden